The Mândra (also: Iaz) is a left tributary of the river Olt in Romania. It flows into the Olt near the village Mândra.

References

Rivers of Romania
Rivers of Brașov County